Founder
Linji Yixuan

A
Ankokuji Ekei
Sōgen Asahina
Ashikaga Yoshimitsu

B
Bassui Tokushō
George Bowman

C
Sherry Chayat
Chō Tsuratatsu 
Chūgan Engetsu 
Leonard Cohen

D
Watazumi Doso
Ji Gong
Ogino Dokuon
 Doshin Hannya Michael Nelson

E
Kanzan Egen
Eisai
Hakuin Ekaku
Enni Ben’en

F
Mary Farkas
Keido Fukushima

G
Jakushitsu Genko

H
Hōjō Tokimune
Shodo Harada
Hakuin Ekaku
Thich Nhat Hanh 
Hsing Yun
Hsin Pei 
Hsin Ping 
Hsin Ting

I
Issan Ichinei
Ikkyu
Imagawa Yoshimoto
Imakita Kosen 
Kazuo Inamori 
Ingen
Ishin Sūden
Itō Jakuchū

J
Ito Jakuchu
Jakushitsu Genkō 
Kaisen Joki 
Josetsu
Jun Po Denis Kelly

K
Imakita Kosen
Kurt Kankan Spellmeyer
Keian Genju

L
John Daido Loori

M
Genjo Marinello
Soko Morinaga
Myokyo-ni
Taizan Maezumi 
Mujū 
Musō Soseki
Meido Moore

N
Kyudo Nakagawa
Soen Nakagawa
Walter Nowick
Eshin Nishimura

O
Ogino Dokuon
Omori Sogen
Enkyo Pat O'Hara

P
Puhua
L.Rōen Prowe

Q

R
Ingen Ryuki

S
Kyozan Joshu Sasaki
Sengai
Nyogen Senzaki
Oda Sesso
Soyen Shaku
Eido Tai Shimano
Denko Sommer
Kokan Shiren
Mugaku Sogen
Sokei-an
Muso Soseki
Ishin Suden
Daisetz Teitaro Suzuki
Sakugen Shūryō 
Sasaki Gensō
Sessai Choro 
Sesshū Tōyō
Sesson Yūbai 
Sheng-yen 
Zenkei Shibayama 
Sōiku Shigematsu 
Kokan Shiren 
Shōtetsu 
Shunoku Sōen 
Gidō Shūshin 
Harada Daiun Sogaku 
Kobori Nanrei Sohaku 
Kurt Kankan Spellmeyer 
Maurine Stuart 
D. T. Suzuki

T
Takuan Sōhō
Genki Takabayashi
Bassui Tokushō
Sesshu Toyo
Fumio Toyoda

U

V

W
Watazumi Doso

X

Y
Sobin Yamada
Gempo Yamamoto
Bankei Yōtaku
Sesson Yubai
Mumon Yamada
William Nyogen Yeo 
Yishan Yining

Z
Dahui Zonggao 
Gotō Zuigan

 
Rinzai